Jagua may refer to:

Places
 Castillo de Jagua, a fortress in Cienfuegos municipality, Cuba
 Jagua (Cienfuegos), a village in Cienfuegos municipality, Cuba
 Jagua, a village in Consolación del Sur municipality, Cuba

Other
 Plants of the genus Genipa
 Jagua tattoo, a type of skin decoration